The Tennessee Fire is the debut album by the rock band My Morning Jacket. It introduced the reverb-heavy sound that is characteristic of the band's early material. This is most apparent in Jim James' vocals, many of which were recorded in an improvised studio above his cousin’s garage. Of the sixteen tracks on the album, only four were re-recorded in a professional studio prior to the album’s release: "Heartbreakin Man", "The Bear", "Evelyn Is Not Real" and "I Think I’m Going to Hell".

In 2019 a deluxe version of the album celebrating its 20th anniversary was released, featuring the original 16-track album alongside 16 additional previously unreleased and unheard tracks, demos, alternate versions and more.

Track listing

“Alabama Come Clean” is a hidden track that isn’t listed on the original release.

The Tennessee Fire: 20th Anniversary Edition

Disc 1 - Original Album

Disc 2 - Bonus Material

Personnel
 Jim James – vocals, guitars, harmonica & banjo
 Johnny Quaid – guitars
 Two Tone Tommy – bass
 J. Glenn – drums

References

External links
 Album listing on My Morning Jacket's official web site
 

My Morning Jacket albums
1999 debut albums
Darla Records albums
Albums produced by Jim James